On February 15, 1947, an Avianca Douglas DC-4 registered C-114 crashed into Mount El Tablazo en route from Barranquilla to Bogotá, Colombia, killing all 53 people on board.

Mount El Tablazo was shrouded in fog when, at 12:18 local time, the aircraft crashed into it at an elevation of about 10,500 feet.  The cause of the crash was determined to be pilot error, with the crew deviating from the designated airway and flying below a safe altitude.

At the time, the crash was the worst commercial airline crash in history,   eventually matched by the crash of Eastern Air Lines Flight 605 near Baltimore three months later.  Several Colombian professional soccer players from Barranquilla perished in the crash, including Romelio Martínez, after whom Barranquilla's municipal stadium was renamed years later.

References

1947 in Colombia
Aviation accidents and incidents in 1947
Airliner accidents and incidents involving controlled flight into terrain
Airliner accidents and incidents caused by pilot error
Aviation accidents and incidents in Colombia
Accidents and incidents involving the Douglas DC-4
Avianca accidents and incidents
February 1947 events in South America